INTRODUCTION

Valuation is fast emerging as an instrument for creating confidence during any financial transactions, be it selling acquiring, purchasing, lending, arbitration, mergers, demerger, liquidation, taxation, partition and financial planning etc.

The motive of a valuation is to track the efficacy of any strategic decision-making procedure and offer the capability to track performance in terms of the estimated change in value, not just in revenue. Therefore, it requires a class of professionals with the necessary competency, eligibility, integrity and reliability to conduct such works of Valuation and deliver credible and high-quality professional services to the stakeholder. 

Here the role of INSTITUTION or ORGANISATION becomes vital as a catalyst to not only fulfil the required aspirations of the stakeholders form a professional regarding their services but also to ensure the credibility of those professionals in the long run.
And one man who started this idea by curating a professional’s group of the first 7 to be a legend, the man, who we dearly call as the Father of the Indian Valuation Profession, Late Shri P.C. Goel (1926-2018), was a legend in himself, known well enough for his dedication, love and sacrifices made to build Institution of Valuers (IOV).

Continued efforts over decades have brought the IOV to a nationally recognized body which is duly honoured and consulted frequently by the Governments as well as policy makers alike. 

ABOUT IOV

The Institution of Valuers (IOV) is the oldest and pioneer organisation in the field of Valuation in INDIA, performing since 1968 having more than 31,000 Valuer Members in all classes of assets. IOV assists in formulating ideas, spreading knowledge and education relating to “Valuation” for the Central / State Governments and Society. IOV has the entire reach of India through its 50 Branches located in various states. IOV has also marked its presence around the globe by representing India in the “Advisory Forum Working Group” of the International Valuation Standards Council (IVSC) as its esteemed member, along with institutional alliances with various countries.

AREAS OF OPERATION

Development of Valuation Profession & Professionals

1.	Capacity Building – 

Holding Capacity Building Programmes to meet the expectations and requirements of the society as a whole in the field of valuation through educational training or continuing education programmes to upskill the professionals and other spirants.

Annual programmes for growth and networking of valuer’s fraternity:

•	Traditionally, an extensive programme is held annually at different places with huge gatherings named Indian Valuers Congress (IVC). IVC provides a crucial platform for disseminating know-how on Valuation and showcasing the profound impact on the current practices of the valuation profession through interaction amongst the Valuers and stakeholders beyond boundaries as well.

•	Towards the promotion of “Valuation Discernment” in the overall hierarchy of the Indian economy, the Valuers Fraternity celebrates Valuers Day, which is the day when Institution of Valuers (IOV) was formed, that is 2nd October, 1968 and enables the entire fraternity to attain the pedestal of a unique profession in the offing.

•	From 21st May 2022, the IOV commenced the holding of Founder’s Day, in addition of Valuers Day on the birth anniversary of Late Shri P.C. Goel Ji, who started this idea by curating a professional group of the first 7 and formed IOV to be legend.

•	For regional outreach IOV hold the National Seminars, Workshops, Lectures, Interactive Sessions, Technical Meetings and conclaves, through online and offline modes across the country throughout the years.

2.	Advocacy – 

Regular interaction with the Governments, Banks, Financial Institutions and other regulatory authorities to create new opportunities for Valuers and provide suggestions for allied purposes.

IN this context, IOV has got MOUs with various organisations and universities to bring a renaissance in the valuation ecosystem.  This leads to increased professionalism and, consequently, better services to the public and the valuation profession.

3.	Developing Best Practices in Valuation

Since profession is growing, so the demand from it is growing too.  In Such fast-changing scenario, quality is sought from the profession.  Therefore, IOV is working on preparing guidelines for the Valuers’ fraternity to ensure the adoption of valuation standards and best practices.

4.	Grievance Redressal in Valuation

Advancement towards Self-Regulation in the Valuation Profession, IOV has formed Advisory Committee for Grievance Redressal in Valuation to facilitate the procedure for registering grievances by any individual/organisations/stakeholders related to the valuation field.  

5.	Developing Technological Software and Tools
Working on providing the best technological tools in the form of an updated website or mobile app. Advancement in this way is the creation of a repository system.

6.	Publications & Research Work

IOV is focusing on research on Valuation by not only publishing monthly journal.

IOV also takes pride in publishing the one and only authentic Valuation journal of India, INDIAN VALUER, with ISSN-2583-3553 since the inception of IOV, which has the larges circulation in India.

IOV MEMBERSHIP DETAILS

IOV Grants Membership to the individuals to become valuers in the following orders:

1.	Honorary Member-shall comprise the class of Fellows.

2.	Corporate Members-shall comprise the classes of Fellows and Associates.

3.	Non-Corporate Members-shall comprise the classes of Licentiates and Student Members.

The Criteria of admission are varied according to the educational qualification & experience in the following categories: -

1.	Land & Building (inclusive of agricultural properties, Plantation Properties, Extractive Industries Properties and Standing Forests)

2.	Plant & Equipment (inclusive of Chemicals, Automobiles, Marine, Textiles, Computer Technology, Tele-Communication, Instrumentation, Ceramics Technology & Potteries, Aeronautics, Metallurgy, Production, Leather and Mining)

3.	Securities & Financial Assets

4.	Business and Business Interests

5.	Jewellery and Precious Stones

6.	Works of Arts

7.	Special Discipline

IOV has also initiated to grant Institutional Membership to Limited Liability Partnership firms, Partnership firms, Partnership firms, Proprietorship, or any such Firms involved in Valuation or other related professional activities and similar bodies.

Apart from this, IOV has initiated to bring in the new categories of Valuers in specific asset valuation under Cat-7 of Special Discipline, such as:

a)	IMPEX (Import-Export) Valuer

b)	Insurance Valuer

c)	Marine Valuer

d)	Valuation Surveyor